Gerrodes minatea is a species of moth in the family Noctuidae (the owlet moths). It is found in North America.

The MONA or Hodges number for Gerrodes minatea is 9304.

References

Further reading

 
 
 

Agaristinae
Articles created by Qbugbot
Moths described in 1912